The 61st Writers Guild of America Awards honored the best film, television, and videogame writers of 2008. Winners were announced on February 7, 2009.

Nominees
Names in bold denote the winners.

Film

Best Adapted Screenplay
The Curious Case of Benjamin Button – Eric Roth (screenplay), Eric Roth and Robin Swicord (story); F. Scott Fitzgerald (author)
The Dark Knight – Jonathan and Christopher Nolan (screenplay), Christopher Nolan and David S. Goyer (story); Bob Kane and Bill Finger (creators)
Doubt – John Patrick Shanley (screenplay and playwright)
Frost/Nixon – Peter Morgan (screenplay and playwright)
Slumdog Millionaire – Simon Beaufoy (screenplay); Vikas Swarup (author)

Best Original Screenplay
Burn After Reading  – Joel Coen and Ethan Coen
Milk – Dustin Lance Black
Vicky Cristina Barcelona – Woody Allen
The Visitor – Tom McCarthy
The Wrestler – Robert Siegel

Best Documentary Feature Screenplay
Boogie Man: The Lee Atwater Story - Stefan Forbes and Noland Walker
Chicago 10 - Brett Morgen
Fuel - Johnny O'Hara
Gonzo: The Life and Work of Dr. Hunter S. Thompson - Alex Gibney; from the words of Hunter S. Thompson
Waltz with Bashir - Ari Folman

Television

Dramatic Series

Comedy Series

New Series

Episodic Drama

Episodic Comedy

Long Form - Original

Long Form - Adaptation

Animation

Comedy/Variety (Including Talk) Series

Comedy/Variety – Music, Awards, Tributes – Specials

Daytime Serials

Children's

Episodic & Specials

Long Form or Special

Documentary

Current events

Other than current events

News

Regularly scheduled, bulletin, or breaking report

Analysis, feature, or commentary

Video games

Videogame Writing 
Star Wars: The Force Unleashed - Haden Blackman, Shawn Pitman, John Stafford and Cameron Suey
Command & Conquer: Red Alert 3 - Writer Haris Orkin, story producer Mical Pedriana
Dangerous High School Girls in Trouble! - Writing Keith Nemitz, additional writing Adrianne Ambrose
Fallout 3 - Lead Writer Emil Pagliarulo, quest writing Erik J. Caponi, Brian Chapin, Jon Paul Duvall, Kurt Kuhlmann, Alan Nanes, Bruce Nesmith and Fred Zeleny, additional quest writing Nate Ellis, William Killeen, Mark Nelson and Justin McSweeney
Tomb Raider: Underworld - Story Eric Lindstrom and Toby Gard, screenplay Eric Lindstrom

Paul Selwin Civil Rights Award
 Dustin Lance Black, "to the member whose script best embodies the spirit of constitutional and civil rights and liberties."

References

External links

2008
W
Writers Guild of America
W
Writers Guild of America Awards
2008 in American cinema
2008 in American television
Writers Guild of America Awards